Dermanyssus is a genus of mites in the family Dermanyssidae. The etymology of the word Dermanyssus is from the Greek: derma, meaning skin, and nyssein, meaning bite.

Genera 

Dermanyssus
Dermanyssus americanus Ewing, 1923
Dermanyssus antillarum Dusbabek & Cerny, 1971
Dermanyssus apodis Roy, Dowling, Chauve & Buronfonsse, 2009
Dermanyssus brevirivulus Gu & Ting, 1992
Dermanyssus brevis Ewing, 1936
Dermanyssus carpathicus Zeman, 1979
Dermanyssus chelidonis Oudemans, 1939
Dermanyssus diphyes Knee, 2008
Dermanyssus faralloni Nelson & Furman, 1967
Dermanyssus gallinae (DeGeer, 1778)
Dermanyssus gallinoides Moss, 1966
Dermanyssus grochovskae Zemskaya
Dermanyssus hirsutus Moss & Radovsky, 1967
Dermanyssus hirundinis (Hermann, 1804)
Dermanyssus lacertarum (Contarini, 1847)
Dermanyssus longipes Berlese & Trouessart
Dermanyssus nipponensis Uchikawa & Kitaoka, 1981
Dermanyssus passerinus Berlese & Trouessart, 1889
Dermanyssus prognephilus Ewing, 1933
Dermanyssus quintus Vitzthum, 1921
Dermanyssus richiardii G. Canestrini & Fanzago, 1877
Dermanyssus rwandae Fain, 1993
Dermanyssus transvaalensis Evans & Till, 1962
Dermanyssus triscutatus Krantz, 1959
Dermanyssus trochilinis Moss, 1978
Dermanyssus wutaiensis Gu & Ting, 1992

References

Mesostigmata